The International Boundary Marker, also known as the Republic of Texas Granite Marker, is a boundary marker located on the Louisiana-Texas border near the junction of Texas FM 31 and Louisiana Highway 765, southeast of Deadwood, Texas. The marker was created in 1840 and placed in 1841 to mark the international border between the United States and the Republic of Texas. The survey which established this border lasted from May 1840 to June 1841; the survey team faced hazardous, swampy conditions in their work and were forced to take several extended breaks due to weather and a lack of funding. The boundary marker is the only marker remaining from the Texas border survey and is one of only two known international boundary markers located entirely within the United States (the other being Ellicott's Stone near Mobile, Alabama).

The property of the  area is shared between DeSoto Parish, Louisiana (1 acre) and Panola County, Texas (2 acres), with the marker itself being a direct property of U.S. Government

The marker was added to the National Register of Historic Places on April 13, 1977. In 1980, the marker was designated as a State Historic Civil Engineering Landmark by the Texas and Louisiana Sections of the American Society of Civil Engineers.

See also

 Dual State Monument: monument on the Arkansas-Louisiana border
 Texhomex: monument on the New Mexico-Oklahoma-Texas tripoint
 National Register of Historic Places listings in DeSoto Parish, Louisiana
 National Register of Historic Places listings in Panola County, Texas

References

External links

Initial points
Monuments and memorials on the National Register of Historic Places in Texas
Monuments and memorials on the National Register of Historic Places in Louisiana
Buildings and structures completed in 1841
Buildings and structures in Panola County, Texas
Buildings and structures in DeSoto Parish, Louisiana
Republic of Texas
Foreign relations of the Republic of Texas
Borders of Texas
Borders of Louisiana
National Register of Historic Places in DeSoto Parish, Louisiana
Boundary markers